Mike MacIntosh (born 1944) was the senior pastor of Horizon Christian Fellowship in San Diego, California, and is a Protestant leader in the United States.

MacIntosh became involved with Calvary Chapel after his conversion under the ministry of evangelist Lonnie Frisbee.  He then went on to pastor Horizon Christian Fellowship, a Calvary Chapel affiliate, beginning in 1974. He is also the organizer of Festival of Life, an international evangelical outreach program.

Books 
 Falling in Love With the Bible 
 Falling in Love With Prayer 
 When Your World Falls Apart 
 The Tender Touch of God 
 Living in the Days of Revelation
 Finding God
 For the Love of Mike (biography by Sherwood Eliot Wirt)

References

External links 
 Horizon Christian Fellowship
 Calvary Chapel

1944 births
Living people
Christian writers
American Christian clergy
American chaplains